Luleč is a municipality and village in Vyškov District in the South Moravian Region of the Czech Republic. It has about 1,000 inhabitants.

Notable people
Marie Kovářová (born 1927), gymnast, Olympic winner

References

Villages in Vyškov District